Guêpe or La Guêpe (French "The Wasp") may refer to:

Books and publications
La Guêpe, a Canadian humour journal published 1857–1861
La Guêpe, a 1934 novel by Albert Touchard
La Guêpe, a 1943 poem by Francis Ponge

Film and TV
La Guêpe (film), a 1986 Canadian film by Gilles Carle
La Guêpe, a 1965 French TV film by François Leterrier

Transportation
La Guêpe (aircraft), French ultralight aircraft
La Guêpe (ship), privateer captured by the Royal Navy in 1800, then HMS Wasp

Other uses
Arthur Guepe (1915–2001), American football player and head coach at the University of Virginia
Guêpe-class submarine, a class of French attack submarines